William's Crowded Hours is the thirteenth book in the Just William series by Richmal Crompton. It was first published in 1931.

The stories
William and the Spy
The Plan That Failed
William and the Young Man
The Outlaws and Cousin Percy Cousin Percy has arrived for Christmas. However, he is too friendly.
William and the Temporary History Master William is victimized by a new teacher at his school - and takes revenge.
A Crowded Hour with William
The Outlaws and The Missionary
The Outlaws and The Tramp
William and the Sleeping Major The Outlaws discover an old man asleep in their headquarters. After failing to waken him, they decide to "sell" him Victor Jameson's gang.
William and the Snowman William throws snowballs at his neighbour, Colonel Fortescue, who strikes their snowman and then believes he has killed Robert. And to make matters worse, Robert is ill.

1931 short story collections
Just William
Short story collections by Richmal Crompton
Children's short story collections
1931 children's books
George Newnes Ltd books